The Brown–Proctor House is a historic residence in Scottsboro, Alabama.  The house was built in 1881 by John A. Brown, who sold it just one year later. He sold the house to General Coffey, who bought the house for his daughter Sarah, for 3,200 dollars.  John Franklin Proctor, a politician who served in the Alabama Legislature from 1892 through 1899 and was an attorney for the Scottsboro Boys in 1931, purchased the house in 1907.  Proctor made numerous renovations to the house, including altering the two-story front portico with Tuscan columns into its current state of a single-level porch supported by Ionic columns with a central second floor balcony.  A three-room addition was also built onto the back of the house, adding to the central hall plan of the original house.  After his death in 1934, Proctor's family owned the house until 1981.

The house was listed on the Alabama Register of Landmarks and Heritage in 1981 and the National Register of Historic Places in 1982.

Scottsboro-Jackson Heritage Center
The Scottsboro-Jackson Heritage Center opened in the house in 1985. The Center focuses on the history, customs, traditions and art of Jackson County, Alabama. Displays include area Native-American cultures and history, area pioneer settlers, the Civil War and the house itself.

References

External links
 Scottsboro-Jackson Heritage Center

National Register of Historic Places in Jackson County, Alabama
Houses on the National Register of Historic Places in Alabama
Houses completed in 1881
Houses in Jackson County, Alabama
Museums in Jackson County, Alabama
Historic house museums in Alabama
Properties on the Alabama Register of Landmarks and Heritage
1881 establishments in Alabama